The Valampuri Vaduganathan Higher Secondary School is a government aided school in Ponnamaravathi established and managed by the Vaduganathan family.

High schools and secondary schools in Tamil Nadu
Education in Pudukkottai district